Killens Pond State Park is a Delaware state park located south of the town of Felton in Kent County, Delaware in the United States. The park surrounds a  pond known as Killens Pond located along the Murderkill River. Amenities available include boating, fishing, hiking, playgrounds, and picnic areas. The park also features a nature center, year-round campgrounds and a water park that is open during the summer months.

History
Killens Pond State Park on the Murderkill River was previously the site of a millpond and the location of several Native American hunting camps and homes. The millpond was built in the late 18th century. The state park was opened to the public in 1965.

Recreation
Killens Pond State Park is opened for year-round recreation and features a waterpark, Killens Pond Water Park. Killens Pond and the Murderkill River are open to fishing and boating. Common game fish include bass, crappie, bluegill, catfish, perch and pickerel. Canoes, rowboats, kayaks and pedal boats are permitted on the pond and the river is the site of the Murderkill River Canoe Trail.

There are several miles of trails at Killens Pond State Park. They are open to hiking, biking, cross-country skiing and cross-country running. There is an 18-hole disc golf course running through the park. The park also features several ballfields and playing courts, as well as a bike path that follows the main park entrance from U.S. Route 13.

References

External links
Killens Pond State Park

Parks in Kent County, Delaware
State parks of Delaware
Protected areas established in 1965
Nature centers in Delaware
1965 establishments in Delaware